Penkovo is a rural locality (a selo) in Kusekeyevsky Selsoviet, Birsky District, Bashkortostan, Russia. The population was 157 as of 2010. There are 5 streets.

Geography 
Penkovo is located 20 km southwest of Birsk (the district's administrative centre) by road. Akudibashevo is the nearest rural locality.

References 

Rural localities in Birsky District